The 1944 Syracuse Orangemen football team represented Syracuse University in the 1944 college football season. The Orangemen were led by seventh-year head coach Ossie Solem and played their home games at Archbold Stadium in Syracuse, New York. Syracuse resumed play after taking a hiatus during the 1943 season due to World War II. They finished the season with a record of 2–4–1.

Schedule

References

Syracuse
Syracuse Orange football seasons
Syracuse Orangemen football